River Hills Mall is an enclosed shopping mall in Mankato, Minnesota. The mall's anchor stores are Barnes & Noble, JCPenney, Target, Cinemark Theatres, and Scheels All Sports. There are 2 vacant anchor stores that were once Herberger's and Sears. A food court and movie theater are among the mall's tenants.

History
The mall opened in 1991 with Herberger's, Target and JCPenney. Scheels All Sports was added in 1993 and relocated in 2006. A health clinic opened at the mall in 2007. Barnes & Noble moved from an existing store nearby in 2008, replacing the original Scheels location. Sears closed in early 2017 and the building is currently vacant.
With the announcement of Herbergers parent company, The Bon Ton being bought out by liquidators, Herberger's closed in mid 2018 and the building is currently vacant. River Hills Mall was sold to the Kohan Retail Investment Group in 2021 for $29.4 million.

References

External links
Official website

Buildings and structures in Blue Earth County, Minnesota
Shopping malls in Minnesota
Shopping malls established in 1991
Tourist attractions in Blue Earth County, Minnesota
Mankato, Minnesota
1991 establishments in Minnesota
Kohan Retail Investment Group